Milton R. Coleman (born November 29, 1946) is an American journalist. He teaches journalism ethics and diversity at Arizona State University's Walter Cronkite School of Journalism and Mass Communication as the Edith Kinney Gaylord Visiting Professor in Journalism Ethics.  He is the former senior editor of The Washington Post, former president of the American Society of News Editors and the current president of Inter American Press Association(IAPA).

Coleman joined The Washington Post in 1976 and was promoted to the deputy managing editor position in 1996. He had played a principal role in the newspaper's strategy and development of zoned editions and improved its coverage of Latinos, including news in Spanish.

He was elected as the president of the American Society of News Editors in April 2010, and president of Inter American Press Association in Oct. 2011. He also has served as a member of the nominating committee for the Pulitzer Prizes in Journalism, a judge for the Robert F. Kennedy Journalism Award and National Association of Black Journalists and Asian American Journalists Association awards, and the chairman of the Seldon Ring Award for Investigative Reporting judging committee.

Coleman graduated from University of Wisconsin–Milwaukee. He was a Southern Education Foundation Fellow in 1971 and a fellow in the Michele Clark Summer Program for Minority Journalists at Columbia University Graduate School of Journalism in 1974.

References

External links

1946 births
Living people
African-American journalists
American male journalists
American newspaper editors
Arizona State University faculty
People from Milwaukee
The Washington Post people
University of Wisconsin–Milwaukee alumni
21st-century African-American people
20th-century African-American people